Antyodaya Anna Yojana  is the sponsored scheme of Government of India to provide highly subsidised food to millions of the poorest families. This scheme was developed by the then Union Food and Civil Supplies Minister, N Sri Vishnu. It was launched by the NDA government on 25 December 2000 and first implemented in the Indian state of Rajasthan.

After identifying the "poorest of the poor" (the 10,000,000 poorest families in the Below Poverty Line category) through surveying, the government began providing them an opportunity to purchase up to 35 kilograms of rice and wheat at a highly subsidised cost of 3 per kilogram of rice and 2 per kilogram of wheat. Poor families were identified by their respective state rural development facilities through the use of surveys. The scheme has been expanded twice, once in June 2003 and then in August 2004, adding an additional 5,000,000 BPL families each time and bringing the total number of families covered up to 20,000,000. after this additional 50 lakh families were added in 2003.

Ration cards
Once a family has been recognized as eligible, they are given a unique "Antyodaya Ration Card". This card, also called the PDS(public distribution card) yellow card, acts as a form of identification, proving that the bearer is authorized to receive the level of rations the card describes. The color of the card is yellow

See also
 Deen Dayal Upadhyay Antodaya Yojana

References

Government schemes in India
2000 introductions
Vajpayee administration
Atal Bihari Vajpayee
2000 establishments in India